Adrian Aliaj (born 24 April 1976) is a retired  Albanian football defender.

Club career
Aliaj started his career at Partizani Tirana in Albania where he made his first team debut at the young age of 16. He then left for Hannover 96 in 1995, then moved  to Croatia the season later. He also played for Standard Liège in Belgium for two years until he moved to Israel to play for Maccabi Petah Tikva. He then returned to Belgium with RAA La Louviere and then R. Charleroi S.C. He left Stade Brest in the summer of 2006 and now plays in the Croatian Second Division for NK Solin.

International career
Aliaj has enjoyed a very good playing career for Albania national football team. He made 29 appearances from 2002 til 2006 and scored eight goals for his country, an unusual high number for a defender.

International goals
Scores and results list Albania's goal tally first

National team statistics

References

External links
 

1976 births
Living people
Footballers from Vlorë
Albanian footballers
Association football defenders
Albania international footballers
FK Partizani Tirana players
Hannover 96 players
Hannover 96 II players
HNK Hajduk Split players
Standard Liège players
Maccabi Petah Tikva F.C. players
R.A.A. Louviéroise players
R. Charleroi S.C. players
Rot-Weiß Oberhausen players
Stade Brestois 29 players
NK Solin players
Al Nassr FC players
Albanian expatriate footballers
Expatriate footballers in Germany
Albanian expatriate sportspeople in Germany
Expatriate footballers in Croatia
Albanian expatriate sportspeople in Croatia
Expatriate footballers in Belgium
Albanian expatriate sportspeople in Belgium
Expatriate footballers in Israel
Albanian expatriate sportspeople in Israel
Expatriate footballers in France
Albanian expatriate sportspeople in France
Expatriate footballers in Saudi Arabia
Albanian expatriate sportspeople in Saudi Arabia
Croatian Football League players
2. Bundesliga players
Belgian Pro League players
Ligue 2 players
Kategoria Superiore players
Israeli Premier League players